is the 25th single by Japanese band Do As Infinity, released on July 27, 2011. This is the first single released after the album Eight, and it was released in two formats. The CD-only version contains the title track plus three live versions of songs featured on Eight. These live versions were sung at the concert "Do As Infinity Live Tour 2011: Eight", recorded at Osaka Namba Hatch on May 15, 2011. The main song, "Chikai", was announced to be used as theme song for a PlayStation Portable game named Sengoku Basara Chronicle Heroes, distributed by Capcom. The CD+DVD version comes with a music video for "Chikai" and an original video of Sengoku Basara.

Track listing

Charts

References

External links
"Chikai (Do As Infinity Ver.)" at Avex Network
"Chikai (Sengoku Basara Ver.)" at Avex Network
"Chikai (Do As Infinity Ver.)" at Oricon
"Chikai (Sengoku Basara Ver.)" at Oricon

2011 singles
Do As Infinity songs
Song recordings produced by Seiji Kameda
2011 songs